Alaa Abdel-Ghany (born 26 January 1979) was an Egyptian football defensive midfielder. He's currently the general coach of Zamalek SC.
When he was a player, He moved to Zamalek from the Arab Contractors along with Ahmed Hossam. Alaa made a marked improvement after transferring to Zamalek and was selected for the Egypt national football team.

Retirement
Abdel-Ghany retired season during the 2008–2009, after having incurred several injuries over a short period of time.

He could have continued playing after a while, but Zamalek released him and he then refused to play with another team.

Honors

Al-Mokawloon Al-Arab
Egyptian Super Cup: 2004

Zamalek
Egypt Cup: 2008

References

External links

1979 births
Living people
Egyptian footballers
Egypt international footballers
Al Mokawloon Al Arab SC players
Zamalek SC players
Egyptian Premier League players
Association football midfielders